Kamran Khan may refer to:

 Kamran Khan (politician), Pakistani politician 
 Kamran Khan (journalist), Pakistani journalist
 Kamran Khan (Indian cricketer) (born 1991), Indian cricketer
 Kamran Khan (Pakistani cricketer) (born 1969), Pakistani cricketer
 Kamran Khan (Qatari cricketer) (born 1988), Qatari cricketer
 Kamran Khan (footballer) (born 1985), football player
 Kamran Khan (squash player) (born 1990), Malaysian squash player